French Polynesia competed as Tahiti at the 2015 Pacific Games in Port Moresby, Papua New Guinea from 4 to 18 July 2015. Tahiti listed 273 competitors as of 4 July 2015. Of these, five competitors were qualified in two sports each.

Athletics

Tahiti qualified 25 athletes in track and field:

Women
 Tea Boyer
 Heiata Brinkfield
 Kahaia Dauphin
 Salome De Barthez De Marmorieres
 Tahiona Doucet
 Elodie Elodie Menou (epse Mevel)
 Mihiatea Gooding
 Timeri Lamorelle
 Vainui Neagle
 Gwoelani Patu
 Candice Richer
 Teumere Lucie Teumere Tepu

Men
 Gregory Bradai
 Tumatai Dauphin
 Louis Ligerot
 Raihau Maiau
 Loic Mevel
 Walter Patu
 Georges Richmond
 Winsy Tama
 Reggie Taumaa
 Namataiki Tevenino
 Teuraiterai Tupaia
 Cedric Wane

Para Sport
Men
 Christian Chee Ayee

Basketball

Tahiti qualified men's and women's teams in basketball (23 athletes in total):

Women
 Heimano Buisson
 Reva Dauphin
 Orama Laille
 Alizee Lefranc
 Oceane Lefranc
 Maea Lextreyt
 Rosa Mahana Tuhiata Mariteragi
 Myranda Mariteragi  (epse Bonnet)
 Aeata Tepu
 Mahine Kamakea Tepu
 Mahinetea Vidal

Men
 Michel Audouin
 Andy Commings
 Eddy Commings
 Glenn Garbutt
 Ariihau Meuel
 Ariirimarau Meuel
 Teva Rauzy
 Derrick Scott
 Reihiti Sommers
 Matehau Taputu
 Rahitiarii Teriierooiterai
 Larry Teriitemataua

Beach volleyball

Tahiti qualified men's and women's teams in beach volleyball (4 athletes in total):

Women
 Onyx Le Bihan
 Heiani Vaki

Men
 Terau Raitama Ena
 Terii Steve Steve Tauraa

Bodybuilding

Tahiti qualified 6 athletes in body building:

Men
 Steve Ah Scha
 Stanley Serge Bruneau
 Gary Colombani
 Simon Luis
 Jean Yann Maitere
 Samuel-Jean Mercier

Boxing

Tahiti qualified 13 athletes in boxing:

Women
 Taraina Rataro-Tuihaa
 Marie-Madeleine Taura
 Edith Tavanae

Men
 Matauarii Ienfa
 Heiarii Mai
 Tautuarii Nena
 Heimata Neuffer
 Ariitea Putoa
 Walter Raurahi
 Terauri Rowan Taurei
 Jordan Tuihaa
 Eddy Tuuhia
 Roger Waoute

Football

Tahiti qualified a men's team in football (24 players):

Men
 Raimana Tipahaehae
 Rainui Aroita
 Temauiarii Crolas
 Raimana Dhalluin
 Vaiarii Halligan
 Manuarii Hauata
 Heremoana Hoata
 Tauhiti Keck
 Tauatua Lucas
 Michel Maihi
 Gael Tevaimoana Meslien
 Louis Petitgas
 Ryan Petitgas
 Thibault Pito
 Noho Raumatahi
 Tehei Taupotini
 Mauarii Tehina
 Tevairoa Tehuritaua
 Tetahio Teriinohopuaiterai
 Raiamanu Tetauira
 Tamatoa Tetauira
 Tuma Tiatoa
 Yohann Tihoni
 Fred Tissot

Golf

Tahiti qualified 9 athletes in golf:

Women
 Mareva Collado-Nordhoff
 Maggy Dury
 Anne Vaea Nauta
 Anne Vaea Nauta
 Denise Taruoura  (ep Yan)

Men
 Tamihau Bougues
 Theo Carlotti
 Jean-François Cazaux
 Matahiapo Wohler

Karate

Tahiti qualified 7 athletes in karate:ref name = tah-karate>

Women
 Vaitiare Tehaameamea

Men
 Killian Laugrost
 Matahi Lemaire
 Honoiti Lien
 Noa Lucas
 Vincent Mikula
 Anapa Otcenasek

Outrigger canoeing

Tahiti qualified 30 athletes in va'a:

Women
 Angelique Aiho
 Utiutirei Flores
 Temake Frida Faura
 Tiahiti Itchner
 Ahipua Lee
 Brenda Vaimiti Maoni
 Hotuniuarii Leila Tama
 Puatea Taruoura
 Rarahu Taruoura
 Hereiti Annette Tavaearii
 Hivalani Tetuamanuhiri
 Mata Tufaimea
 Sandy Vane
 Rose Veselsky

Men
 Ariioehau Gordon Tamatea Bourgerie
 Tuteariimaroura Hoatua
 Moe Miti Teihoarii Ihorai Brotherson
 Sly Rendy Jefferson Ly Sao
 Raunui Jhon Makiroto-Piritua
 Tuatini Alfred Makiroto-Piritua
 Manuarai Maruaitu
 Tauhiti Nena
 Brice Tihaunui Punuataahitua
 Heiata Ravahere Manea
 Hititua Taerea
 Teraivetea Taruoura
 Harley Maui Tavaearii
 Abel Arii Teriitemataua
 Revi Landry Raihau Thon Sing
 Temanarii Utia

Powerlifting

Tahiti qualified 9 athletes in powerlifting:

Women
 Titiri Marie-Anne Charton
 Alexandrine Fanaura
 Claudine Yu Hing

Men
 Joachim Ah Scha
 Zelyko Manua
 Augustin Rua
 Hinau Teotahi
 Teremu Touatekina
 Nelva Vahimarae

Rugby sevens

Tahiti qualified men's and women's teams in rugby sevens (25 players in total):

Rugby Union 7s
Women
 Cloe Devaluez
 Eva Huchede
 Maruiata Hurahutia
 Lucette Kimitete
 Toimata Mickaeli Mooria
 Nawel Remini
 Desire Takatai
 Herenui Tehuiotoa
 Anais Heimata Temarii
 Meihiti Teriinohopuaiterai
 Hanaley Teuira  (ep Yun Shan Fat)
 Florine Tevero
 Raitiare Tihani Tokoragi

Men
 Teuira Frogier
 Vainui Frogier
 Andoni Jimenez
 Taitearii Mahuru
 Foliaki Makalea
 Vincent Perez
 Marc Richmond
 François Tardieu
 Yves Tehaameamea
 Anthony Tesquet
 Haley Teuira
 Andrew Vanaa

Sailing

Tahiti qualified 6 athletes in sailing:

Women
 Elise Djenadi
 Gwenaelle Janicaud
 Emmanuel Rousseau

Men
 Arnaud Teva Bourdelon
 Tuiterai Salmon
 Teiva Veronique

Shooting

Tahiti qualified 8 athletes in shooting:

Women
 Marie-Louise Normand  (ep Darius)  – 10 m air pistol female.

Men
 Moeava Bambridge
 Tuanua Degage
 Gabriel Lan San  – 10 m air pistol male. 
 Alexandre Lehartel
 Jean-Pierre Mihuraa
 Jean-Hiro Pratx
 Freddy Yen Kway  – 25 m pistol mixed.

Squash

Tahiti qualified 8 athletes in squash:

Women
 Heimana Charles  (ep Chung)
 Isabelle Gouaille  (ep Olite)
 Agnes Pierson  (ep Chantre)
 Beatrice Villa

Men
 Ridge Chung
 Laurent Ferruci
 Yann Lo
 Phillippe Rougier

Swimming

Tahiti qualified 9 athletes in swimming:

Women
 Mehani Bernadino
 Alizee Diaz

Men
 Anthony Clark
 Rahiti De Vos
 Stephane Debaere
 Teiki Dupont
 Hugo Lambert
 Henere Sommers
 Rainui Teriipaia-Rentier

Table tennis

Tahiti qualified 10 athletes in table tennis:

Women
 Alize Belrose
 Rachel Hsiao
 Tearo Le Caill
 Melveen Richmond
 Aurelie Cyrine Sam
 Tuarikirau Thunot

Men
 Gregoire Dossier
 Ocean Belrose
 Hugo Gendron
 Tinihau-O-Terai Klouman

Taekwondo

Tahiti qualified 13 athletes in taekwondo:

Women
 Alison Deane
 Moehau Faaite
 Urariimarotini Hamblin
 Mataheitini Raihauti
 Taraina Rataro-Tuihaa
 Horue Taufa

Men
 Peter Babka
 Waldeck Defaix
 Lloyd Tuarai Hery
 Manu Huaatua
 Teava Mu
 Kaheiani Pittman
 Teddy Teng

Tennis

Tahiti qualified 9 athletes in tennis:

Women
 Naia Guitton
 Ravahere Marie-Emilie Rauzy
 Estelle Tehau
 Mayka Tehani Zima

Men
 Reihiti Chin Meun
 Patrice Cotti
 Heve Kelley
 Reynald Taaroa
 Angelo Yersin

Triathlon

Tahiti qualified 6 athletes in triathlon:

Women
 Kari Lee Armour  (ep Lazzari)
 Salome De Barthez De Marmorieres
 Poerava Van Bastolaire

Men
 Laurent Barra
 Keanu Lorfevre
 Benjamin Zorgnotti

Volleyball

Tahiti qualified men's and women's teams in volleyball (28 athletes in total):

Women
 Tehea Labaste
 Tehei Labaste
 Vaimiti Lee Tam
 Hinarii Mahai
 Poai-Ura Manate
 Maimiti Patricia Patricia Mare  (ep Taputuarai)
 Raurea Marie-Lise Temarii
 Matirita Stephanie Moua
 Valeria Paofai  (epse Vaki)
 Grace Patu
 Hinanui Teai
 Taiana Tere
 Katia Tetuanui
 Louisa Lokelani Lokelani Vero

Men
 Wilson Tuitete Bonno
 Jim Hapipi
 Vehiatua Heitarauri
 Benjamin Leprado
 Vaianuu Mare
 Heimana Marii
 Emile Yoan Teanuanu Paofai
 Nohoarii Paofai
 Arona Pitomai
 Tapuragni Sommers
 Vatea Mikael Tauraa
 Maruake Teivao
 Haereotahi Terorohauepa
 Ryan Utia

Weightlifting

Tahiti qualified 6 athletes in weightlifting:

Women
 Titiri Marie-Anne Charton
 Tehea Riipeu  (epse Ratia)
 Claudine Yu Hing

Men
 Daniel Mana
 Honoura Roopinia
 Teremu Touatekina

Notes

References

External links
 Find an Athlete query menu on official website

2015 in French Polynesian sport
Nations at the 2015 Pacific Games
Tahiti at the Pacific Games